François Cheng (born 30 August 1929) is a Chinese-born French academician, writer, poet, and calligrapher. He is the author of essays, novels, collections of poetry and books on art written in the French language, and the translator of some of the great French poets into Chinese.

Biography 
Born in Nanchang, Jiangxi in 1929, Cheng traveled to France in 1948 at the age of nineteen. In his 2002 speech to the Académie française, Cheng said, 
"I became a Frenchman in law, mind and heart more than thirty years ago [...] especially from that moment when I resolutely went over to the French language, making it the weapon, or the soul, of my creative work. This language, how can I say everything that I owe to it? It is so intimately bound up with the way I live and my inner life that it has proved to be the emblem of my destiny."

Cheng's first works were academic studies about Chinese poetry and painting. In the late 1960s and early 1970s, he worked with the psychoanalyst Jacques Lacan on studying and translating texts from the classical Chinese canon. These exchanges informed Lacan's late teaching on psychoanalytic interpretation. Later he began to write poems in French, before finally turning to the writing of novels.

Cheng won the 1998 Prix Femina for his novel Le Dit de Tianyi ("The Tale of Tianyi") (Albin Michel, Paris, 1998). In 2002 he was elected to the Académie française, the first person of Asian origin to be so honored. Since 2008, he has been a member of the Fondation Chirac's honour committee.

Marriage and family
Cheng married a painter who was also a Chinese national. They became French citizens and had a family. Their daughter Anne Cheng, born in Paris in 1955, also became an academic and sinologist.

Bibliography
Analyse formelle de l'œuvre poétique d'un auteur des Tang : Zhang Ruoxu (1970)
Le Pousse-pousse, by Lao She, (translation, 1973)
L'Écriture poétique chinoise (1977)
Vide et plein: le langage pictural chinois (1979)
L'espace du rêve: mille ans de peinture chinoise (1980)
Sept poètes français (1983)
Henri Michaux, sa vie, son œuvre (1984)
Chu Ta : le génie du trait (1986)
Some Reflections on Chinese Poetic Language and its Relation to Chinese Cosmology dans The Vitality of the Lyric Voice (1986)
The Reciprocity of Subject and Object in Chinese Poetic Language dans Poetics East and West (1988)
De l'arbre et du rocher (1989)
Entre source et nuage, Voix de poètes dans la Chine d'hier et d'aujourd'hui (1990)
Saisons à vie (1993)
Trente-six poèmes d'amour (1997)
Quand les pierres font signe (1997) (with Fabienne Verdier)
Le Dit de Tianyi (1998, Prix Femina)
Shitao : la saveur du monde (1998, Prix André Malraux)
Cantos toscans (1999)
D'où jaillit le chant (2000)
Double chant (2000, Prix Roger Caillois)
Et le souffle devient signe (2001)
Qui dira notre nuit (2001)
L'éternité n'est pas de trop, Albin Michel, (2002)
Le Dialogue, Une passion pour la langue française, Desclée de Brouwer, (2002)
Le Long d'un amour, Arfuyen, (2003)
Le Livre du vide médian, Albin Michel, (2004)
Que nos instants soient d'accueil, with Francis Herth (2005)
À l'orient de tout, Gallimard, (2005)
Cinq méditations sur la beauté, Albin Michel, (2006)
L'un vers l'autre. En voyage avec Victor Segalen, Albin Michel, (2008)
Quand reviennent les âmes errantes, Albin Michel, (2012)
Cinq méditations sur la mort – autrement dit sur la vie – Broché (2013)''

See also
Chinese diaspora in France

References

External links
 Biography on the Académie française website

1929 births
Living people
People from Nanchang
Members of the Académie Française
Chinese emigrants to France
20th-century Chinese poets
Nanjing University alumni
École pratique des hautes études alumni
Prix Roger Caillois recipients
Prix Femina winners
20th-century French male writers
20th-century French poets
21st-century French poets
21st-century French male writers
French translators
Officiers of the Légion d'honneur
Audiobook narrators
Chevaliers of the Ordre des Palmes Académiques
Commandeurs of the Ordre des Arts et des Lettres
French male non-fiction writers
Naturalized citizens of France
University of Nanking alumni
French-language writers from China